Taylor dispersion or Taylor diffusion is an effect in fluid mechanics in which a shear flow can increase the effective diffusivity of a species. Essentially, the shear acts to smear out the concentration distribution in the direction of the flow, enhancing the rate at which it spreads in that direction. The effect is named after the British fluid dynamicist G. I. Taylor, who described the shear-induced dispersion for large Peclet numbers. The analysis was later generalized by Rutherford Aris for arbitrary values of the Peclet number. The dispersion process is sometimes also referred to as the Taylor-Aris dispersion.

The canonical example is that of a simple diffusing species in uniform
Poiseuille flow through a uniform circular pipe with no-flux
boundary conditions.

Description

We use z as an axial coordinate and r as the radial
coordinate, and assume axisymmetry. The pipe has radius a, and
the fluid velocity is:

 

The concentration of the diffusing species is denoted c and its
diffusivity is D. The concentration is assumed to be governed by
the linear advection–diffusion equation:

 

The concentration and velocity are written as the sum of a cross-sectional average (indicated by an overbar) and a deviation (indicated by a prime), thus:

 
 

Under some assumptions (see below), it is possible to derive an equation just involving the average quantities:

 

Observe how the effective diffusivity multiplying the derivative on the right hand side is greater than the original value of diffusion coefficient, D. The effective diffusivity is often written as:

 
where  is the Péclet number, based on the channel radius . The interesting result is that for large values of the Péclet number, the effective diffusivity is inversely proportional to the molecular diffusivity. The effect of Taylor dispersion is therefore more pronounced at higher Péclet numbers.

In a frame moving with the mean velocity, i.e., by introducing , the dispersion process becomes a purely diffusion process,

 

with diffusivity given by the effective diffusivity.

The assumption is that  for given , which is the case if the length scale in the  direction is long enough to smooth the gradient in the  direction. This can be translated into the requirement that the length scale  in the  direction satisfies:
 .

Dispersion is also a function of channel geometry. An interesting phenomenon for example is that the dispersion of a flow between two infinite flat plates and a rectangular channel, which is infinitely thin, differs approximately 8.75 times. Here the very small side walls of the rectangular channel have an enormous influence on the dispersion.

While the exact formula will not hold in more general circumstances, the mechanism still applies, and the effect is stronger at higher Péclet numbers. Taylor dispersion is of particular relevance for flows in porous media modelled by Darcy's law.

Derivation
One may derive the Taylor equation using method of averages, first introduced by Aris. The result can also be derived from large-time asymptotics. In the dimensional coordinate system , consider the fully-developed Poiseuille flow  flowing inside a pipe of radius , where  is the average velocity of the fluid. A species of concentration  with some arbitrary distribution is to be released at somewhere inside the pipe at time . As long as this initial distribution is compact, for instance the species/solute is not releases everywhere with finite concentration level, the species will be convected along the pipe with the mean velocity . In a frame moving with the mean velocity and scaled with following non-dimensional scales

Thus in this moving frame, at times  (in dimensional variables), the species will diffuse radially. It is clear then that when  (in dimensional variables), the concentration is expected to become uniform across the pipe and start to diffuse in the  direction. Taylor dispersion explains the diffusion process for large .

Suppose , where  is a small number. Then at these times, the concentration would spread to an axial extent . To quantify large-time behavior, the following rescalings

can be introduced. The equation then becomes

Since , the solution can be expanded in an asymptotic series,  Substituting this series into the governing equation and collecting terms of different orders will lead to series of equations. At leading order, the equation obtained is

Integrating this equation with boundary conditions defined before, one finds . At this order,  is still an unknown function.

Terms of order  leads to the equation

Integrating this equation with respect to  using the boundary conditions leads to

Terms of order  leads to the equation

This is also the same as averaging the above equation over the radial direction. Using the boundary conditions and results obtained in the previous two orders, the solvability condition leads (going back to  variables) to 

This is the required diffusion equation. Going back to the laboratory frame and dimensional variables, the equation becomes

References

Other sources
 Aris, R. (1956) , Proc. Roy. Soc. A., 235, 67–77.
 Frankel, I. & Brenner, H. (1989) , J. Fluid Mech., 204, 97–119.
 Taylor, G. I. (1953) , Proc. Roy. Soc. A., 219, 186–203.
 Taylor, G. I. (1954) , Proc. Roy. Soc. A, 223, 446–468.
 Taylor, G. I. (1954) , Proc. Roy. Soc. A., 225, 473–477.
 Brenner, H. (1980) , Phil. Trans. Roy. Soc. Lon. A, 297, 81.
 Mestel. J. Taylor dispersion — shear augmented diffusion, Lecture Handout for Course M4A33, Imperial College.

Fluid mechanics
Fluid dynamics